Norddal or Norddalsfjord is a village in Kinn Municipality in Vestland county, Norway. The village lies along the Norddalsfjorden at the entrance to the Solheimsdalen valley. It sits at the mouth of the Norddalselva river on a small peninsula that sticks out into the fjord. Nordal Church is located in the small village, serving the northeastern part of the municipality.

References

Villages in Vestland
Kinn